Utricularia longeciliata is a small to medium-sized perennial carnivorous plant that belongs to the genus Utricularia. U. longeciliata is endemic to South America, where it can be found in Brazil, Colombia, Guyana, Suriname, and Venezuela. It flowers throughout the year in its native range. U. longeciliata was originally described and published by Alphonse Pyrame de Candolle in 1844.

See also 
 List of Utricularia species

References 

Carnivorous plants of South America
Flora of Brazil
Flora of Colombia
Flora of Guyana
Flora of Suriname
Flora of Venezuela
longeciliata